Phyllonorycter erugatus is a moth of the family Gracillariidae. It is known in the United States from widely scattered localities from Santa Clara County near sea level in mid-coastal California north to southern Alaska and west to the Rocky Mountains of Colorado to elevations of 2,800 meters.

The length of the forewings is 3.7-4.8 mm. Adults are on wing from late July to early October. There might be two generations per year in the southern part of the range.

The larvae feed on Populus balsamifera and possibly other Populus species. They mine the leaves of their host plant.

Etymology
The specific name is derived from the Greek erugo (smooth, clear of wrinkles), in reference to the smooth, apical process of the male valvae.

References

erugatus
Moths of North America
Moths described in 2001